Mithra (Shinu George; born 12 May 1977) is an Indian actor, stand-up comedian, television actor, producer and entrepreneur, who has mainly worked in Kannada cinema. He debuted as a small time actor in the film Shreeram in 2003 and went on to appear in more than 100 films. Prior to films, he worked as a tourists' entertainer in Coorg district of Karnataka. Following this, he appeared in a host of television comedy sitcoms such as Silli Lalli , Paapa Pandu and Parijatha. He also participated in various reality shows such as Bigg Boss Kannada 3, Comedy Khiladigalu and Maja With Sruja. He turned producer with the film Raaga in which he plays the lead role along with Bhama.

Television

Filmography (selected)

Shreeram (2003)
 Pancharangi
 Patharagitti
 Smuggler
 Manasare
 Kool...Sakkath Hot Maga
 Mandahasa
 Ayodhyapuram
 Kotlallappo Kai
 Dev S/o Mudde Gowda
 Teenage
 Kanchana
 Olave Vismaya
 90
 Chatrapathi
 Raja Huli
 Topiwala
 Ko Ko
 Nanjanagudu Nanjunda
 Wareh Wah
 Chaddi Dost
 Ondu Kshanadalli
 Dudhsagar
 Agraja
 Nan Lifealli
 Baasu, Ade Haley Kathe
 Sapnon Ki Rani
 Ondrupayalli Eredu Preethi (Toss)
 Jamboo Savari
 Passenger
 Anarkali
 Aadu Aata Aadu
 Eradondla Mooru
 Ee Dil Helide Nee Bekantha
 Drama
 Jackie
 Victory
 Aramane
 Romeo
 Duniya
 Lifeu Ishtene
 Nandeesha
 Yaksha
 Aithalakkadi
 Jungle Jackie
 Rajakumari
 Circus
 Ullasa Utsaha
 Zindagi
 Bindas Hudugi
Olave Jeevana Lekkachaara
Rakhi
Style King
Deal Raja
Cigarette
Nithya Jothe Sathya
Jaatre
Sharp Shooter
Jilebi
Raaga (Produced and acted)
Sarvajanikarige Suvarnavakasha

References

External links

Filmibeat profile

1977 births
Living people
Male actors in Kannada cinema
Indian male film actors
Indian stand-up comedians
Male actors from Kottayam
21st-century Indian male actors
Indian male television actors
Malayali people
Indian male comedians
Kannada film producers
Film producers from Kerala
Businesspeople from Kottayam
Bigg Boss Kannada contestants